Shinzo, known as  in Japan, is an anime television series produced by TV Asahi, Toei Advertising, and Toei Animation. It was directed by Tetsuo Imazawa, with Mayori Sekijima handling series scripts, Sachiko Kamimura designing the characters and Katsumi Horii composing the music. In the series, genetically-altered creatures known as Enterrans take over Earth and rename it in their own image called Enterra. Now three Enterrans have to protect the last human in order to find the hidden sanctuary called Shinzo and restore the human race. The anime focuses primarily on the adventures they undergo while working to accomplish this task, though battle action becomes the main focus in the middle of the series. Due in part to the popularity of Hunter × Hunter in some areas in the competing timeslot, the series struggled with an average viewership of 3.5%, and was cancelled. In the United States, the anime was licensed and dubbed by Saban Entertainment & Buena Vista Television.

Plot
In the distant past, the Guardian of the Milky Way galaxy named Lanancuras began to harbor a desire for more power. Because of his connection to the galaxy, he was able to absorb parts of planets and add them to his strength. As a result, he began invading the worlds he was assigned to protect. In the wake of his destruction, a following of creatures from across the galaxy pledged allegiance to Lanancuras and became known as the Kadrians. Taking notice of his ever-growing power and followers, the other Celestial Guardians confronted him; however, he had become too powerful, and they were defeated. Unable to subdue Lanancuras, the Celestial Guardians each gave up a part of their power and combined it into a single new Guardian, Mushra. In a final desperate attempt, they used Mushra's core by transforming it into a powerful card with which to seal Lanancuras in a prison. The prison was created from the remains of planets that had suffered under Lanancuras' tyranny. Because planets are themselves large beings, their combined strength (along with the power of the card) was able to restrain him. Thus Lanancuras was successfully sealed in a large meteorite.

The meteorite was sent off into the galaxy to be sealed forever. Meanwhile, the way Lanancuras had increased his strength had consequences on the planets of the Milky Way On Earth, around the 22nd century, it was in the shape of a virus that merged with human DNA and destroyed the humans that way. In order to eliminate the virus, scientists worked on combining human DNA with the DNA of animals and other creatures immune to the effects. They succeeded and created a sentient race known as Enterrans (a race of engineered Earthlings) which are based on humans, insects, reptiles, birds, sea creatures, wild beasts, and phantom beasts. Eventually, a cure was found and the human race survived.

However, due to Lanancuras' influence, the Enterrans fought their human creators as well as the robots that worked with the humans, driving the human race to a near extinction state. Luckily, a scientist named Dr. Daigo Tatsuro placed his 4-year-old daughter Yakumo in a sleep chamber in hopes that she would save the human race and find the human sanctuary Shinzo and bring peace back to Earth which was then renamed to Enterra. When the meteor that Lanancuras was imprisoned in struck Earth during the earlier parts of the Human-Enterran War, its fragment had struck an infant Yakumo giving her abilities that she would later discover.

First season (episodes 1–21)
Upon waking up 300 years later at the age of 17, Yakumo Tatsuro stumbled upon her soon to be companion Mushra while he is strung above a waterfall for impersonating a king. After Yakumo rescues Mushra, they soon run into their other companions Sago and Kutal.

Mushra, Sago and Kutal are then shown to be Hyper-Enterrans, Enterrans who can transform into stronger powered-up versions of themselves; these forms allow them to fight the various Enterrans that come after them. Throughout the first season the main characters fight a collection of Enterrans known as the Seven Enterran Generals, and various independent Enterrans where these Enterrans were either minions of the Seven Enterran Generals or bounty hunters that target Yakumo for the bounty on her head. Each of these Generals rules a region that the gang travels through, which have different types of Enterrans, such as King Daku's land having a majority insect based Enterrans. The defeated Enterrans become En-Cards, which are card-like structures that can be used to increase power in both Enterrans and several machines such as Yakumo's sentient vehicle Hakuba.

Second season (episodes 22–32)
When the timeline was altered due to events caused by Rusephine removing Mushrambo from the past. The Human-Enterran war never occurred with the two species eventually settling their differences and peacefully coexisting. The ultimate cause of the Enterran genocide during the war in the original timeline was revealed. The Kadrians had devised a plan to free their master: they believed that crashing the meteor into Earth would destroy the seal, thus allowing Lanancuras to escape. The Guardians eventually discovered this plan, but it was too late. With the meteorite already redirected and heading towards Earth, the Guardians held a vow that they would not directly intervene. They reasoned it was the duty of the planet and its inhabitants to defeat Lanancuras. In a stroke of luck, the Kadrians' plan was not a complete success. At impact, the seal holding Lanancuras merely ripped due to the impact; therefore, the Kadrian King was still trapped by the planetary pieces.

In the first timeline, Lanancuras used up a lot of energy to influence the Human-Enterran War when his meteor struck Earth, therefore remaining completely dormant. As this there weren't means to cause the war in the second, he was energized and about to break free from his imprisonment there.

Characters

Media

Manga
A two-volume manga adaptation by Yoshihiro Iwamoto was serialized from the February to September 2000 issues of Kodansha's Comic BomBom magazine. The plot is completely different from the anime version, which is more tragic, and has a happy ending where Mushra and Yakumo get married and raise a daughter. The complete DVD of the anime comes with a "Comic Book Version Mushrambo 3D Sound Special Drama" (audio drama), which includes a digest of the main story and later developments. The voice of Yakumo's father Daigo was provided by Ayumi Miyazaki, who sang the anime's theme song, and the voice of Ganchan in the later part was provided by Yoshihiro Iwamoto, who drew the manga.

Anime

Season 1

Season 2

Background
The series is an adaptation of the 16th-century Chinese novel Journey to the West by Wu Cheng'en, transplanting the events to a far-future science fiction setting. Tang Sanzang becomes Yakumo, a girl tasked with reviving the human race rather than retrieving sacred scriptures. Sha Wujing becomes Sago, Zhu Bajie becomes Kutal (who transforms into a lion), and Sun Wukong becomes Mushra (retaining the character's golden headband and telescoping staff).

References

External links
 Official website 
 

2000 anime television series debuts
Japanese children's animated action television series
Japanese children's animated adventure television series
Japanese children's animated science fantasy television series
Adventure anime and manga
Anime with original screenplays
Card games in anime and manga
Fantasy anime and manga
Television series about shapeshifting
Fox Kids
Science fiction anime and manga
Toei Animation television
TV Asahi original programming
Shōnen manga
Chinese mythology in anime and manga